Kisha e Shën Mitrit is the name of several monuments in Albania:

Kisha e Shën Mitrit (Debranik), Berat County
Kisha e Shën Mitrit (Poliçan), Berat County
Kisha e Shën Mitrit (Boboshticë), Korçë County
Kisha e Shën Mitrit (Bezmisht), Korçë County